Halolimnohelix conradti is a species of air-breathing land snail, terrestrial pulmonate gastropod mollusks in the family Halolimnohelicidae.

This species is endemic to Tanzania.

References

Halolimnohelicidae
Endemic fauna of Tanzania
Taxa named by Eduard von Martens
Taxonomy articles created by Polbot